Bitlis Vilayet ( Bit'lisi vilayet' , Ottoman Turkish: ولایت بتليس) was a first-level administrative division (vilayet) of the Ottoman Empire. Before the Russo-Turkish War (1877–1878) it had been part of the Erzurum Vilayet, it was then made a separate vilayet by the Porte. It was one of the six Armenian vilayets of the Empire.

The accuracy of the population figures ranges from "approximate" to "merely conjectural" depending on the region from which they were gathered.

Bitlis and Muş were formerly included in the Eyalet of Erzurum. In 1875, they were detached and made a separate vilayet. The sanjak of Siirt was joined to the vilayet of Bitlis from Diyarbekir Vilayet in 1883–84.

Administrative divisions

Sanjaks of Bitlis Vilayet:
 Sanjak of Bitlis (Bitlis, Ahlat, Hizan, Mutki)
 Sanjak of Muş (Muş, Bulanık, Sason, Malazgirt, Varto)
 Sanjak of Siirt (Siirt, Eruh, Pervari, Şirvan, Kurtalan)
 Sanjak of Genç (Genç, Çapakçur, Kulp)

References

External links
 
 

 
Ottoman period in Armenia
Vilayets of the Ottoman Empire in Anatolia
History of Bitlis
History of Bitlis Province
History of Bingöl Province
History of Siirt Province
1875 establishments in the Ottoman Empire
1923 disestablishments in the Ottoman Empire